Martin Guerre is a two-act musical with a book by Claude-Michel Schönberg and Alain Boublil, lyrics by Alain Boublil, Edward Hardy and Stephen Clark, and music by Claude-Michel Schönberg.

Written in the operatic style similar to the creative team's previous efforts, Les Misérables and Miss Saigon, the bulk of the show is sung-through, with little spoken dialogue between the musical numbers. It failed to match the box office success of its two predecessors.

Synopsis
Loosely based on the real-life historical figure Martin Guerre and the 1982 film The Return of Martin Guerre he inspired, the story is set in early modern France in the anti-Protestant town of Artigat, where young Martin Guerre is forced into an arranged marriage with Bertrande de Rols in order to produce a Catholic heir. Martin is unsatisfied with the marriage, complicated by the fact that a childhood friend, Guillaume, is secretly in love with Bertrande. Beaten by the priests due to his failure to consummate the union, Martin abandons his home and Bertrande to fight the Protestant Huguenots, and it is during the skirmishes that he befriends Arnaud du Thil with whom he shares his history, beginning the story at this point, seven years later, in medias res. When Martin appears to die in battle, Arnaud goes to his village to inform Bertrande of her husband's death but, mistaken for the deceased soldier by the residents, he decides to play along with their error and becomes involved with Bertrande. Aware of Arnaud's deception, Bertrande decides to keep his secret and the two discover a mutual romantic attraction while Arnaud takes the name "Martin Guerre" for himself. Guillaume, who had until now hoped for a chance with Bertrande romantically, becomes envious of the supposedly returned soldier. As Bertrande, secretly converted to Protestantism, also turns Arnaud to her faith, Guillaume uncovers their beliefs and so they are assaulted by a roused mob. Before Arnaud is killed, however, Benoit, the knowing village idiot, reveals that he is not truly Martin Guerre, but rather, an imposter. The authorities arrest Arnaud—still claiming that he is Martin—under charges of deception and at the end of the trial, Martin Guerre himself, having apparently survived the war, appears as the last witness. In prison, Arnaud, however, is freed by Martin who forgives him for stealing his identity, noting the legitimacy of Arnaud and Bertrande's love for each other. The mob, though, sets the town ablaze and Guillaume stabs Arnaud before he can escape. As Arnaud dies in Bertrande's arms, Martin and Bertrande sing mournfully about love and the two part for good. The town contemplates their own xenophobic actions remorsefully.

Productions and background
When first approached by Schönberg and Boublil, Cameron Mackintosh, who had produced their earlier works, expressed little interest in producing the project as it existed. Only after several dramatic revisions, in which the character of Guerre became more heroic and greater emphasis was placed on the theme of religious intolerance, did he become enthusiastic about its potential.

London (1996–1998)
Six years in the making, Mackintosh's $6 million West End production, directed by Declan Donnellan and choreographed by Bob Avian, with lyrics by Edward Hardy, opened on July 10, 1996 at the Prince Edward Theatre.  It was a spectacular production, but not only were the reviews mixed, there were also some major concerns expressed by the public and the creative team alike. In the early weeks, the creative team worked hard and quickly to clarify the narrative, rearrange some of the material, and remove one pretty, but nonessential song.

The mostly brutal reviews prompted the producer to examine carefully all the problems and take dramatic action to fix them. While the cast continued to perform the show, the creative team – now augmented by additional lyricist Clark – virtually rewrote it, adding new scenes and songs, shortening the overly long beginning, providing a happier ending, and shifting the focus to Bertrande. In order to make more radical changes, the show closed from October 28–31, 1996, and the production was completely revised. This revised version opened after a week of previews on November 11, 1996. The critical response was significantly improved, and the revised show went on to win the 1997 Laurence Olivier Award for Best Musical and Best Choreography.

In June 1997 some further changes were made to the production to coincide with the cast change. The production closed on February 28, 1998 after 675 performances.

UK tour (1999)
The West Yorkshire Playhouse in Leeds was the new home for a completely rewritten version of Martin Guerre. The Artistic Director Jude Kelly invited the writers Alain Boublil and Claude-Michel Schonberg to rework their musical there, and in a co-production between the West Yorkshire Playhouse and Cameron Mackintosh, Martin Guerre opened on December 8, 1998. The libretto was rewritten extensively, a number of new songs were added, and many of the original tunes were retitled, repositioned, and/or were given new lyrics. The physical production was trimmed considerably to make it more intimate and less blockbuster.  In addition, the logo was changed from the original red to a black background.

It then embarked on a national tour which ended in Bristol on August 7, 1999 after 227 performances. The tour also played Newcastle, Glasgow, Aberdeen, Norwich, Edinburgh, Manchester, Birmingham, Llandudno, Nottingham and Plymouth.

US tour (1999–2000)
The North American premiere was at the Guthrie Theater in Minneapolis on September 29, 1999, for an 8-week engagement. The Artistic Director Joe Dowling welcomed the opportunity for a co-production between the Guthrie Theater and Cameron Mackintosh so that Martin Guerre could be fine-tuned for its first American audience.

There was some more reworking for this production. Some musical numbers were moved and there was a general softening of the village characters to make them more likable and more individualized. According to Mackintosh "Forty percent of the current material was not in the original." The production starred Hugh Panaro, Erin Dilly and Stephen R. Buntrock in the US tour in 1999–2000. The tour played Minneapolis, Detroit, Washington, Seattle and Los Angeles.

A planned Broadway opening never materialized.

Denmark (1999–2000)
A licensed production of Martin Guerre opened at the Odense Theater in Denmark on December 30, 1999 and it ran until March 6, 2000.

Newbury (2007)
A revival of the musical at the Watermill Theatre near Newbury, England, ran in July 2007. There was a company of 12 actor/musicians, starring Andrew Bevis and directed by Craig Revel Horwood. Based largely on the London version that had premiered in November 1996, there were further lyrical changes, and "Live With Somebody You Love" from the touring version was inserted into the score. This production made one central change to the premise of the previous versions of the musical; Bertrande does not (appear to) know that the imposter is not her returning husband until the court scene in act 2. The character of Martin was made far more hostile in this version.  This production also had more spoken dialogue, a conscious decision made by the composers, who reworked the show whilst they were in rehearsals for The Pirate Queen.

Songs

1996 West End

 "Prologue"
 "Working on the Land"
 "Where's the Child"
 "Martin Guerre"
 "Here Comes the Morning"
 "Sleeping On Our Own"
 "When Will Someone Hear?"
 "Louison/ Welcome Home"
 "Tell Me to Go"
 "Bethlehem"
 "All I Know"
 "Entr'acte" 
 "The Courtroom"
 "Me"
 "Martin Guerre" (Reprise)
 "Someone"
 "The Imposters"
 "The Last Witness"
 "I Will Make You Proud"
 "The Madness"
 "The Reckoning"
 "Land of the Fathers"

1999 UK/US tour

 "Prologue"ψ
 "Live with Somebody You Love"ψ
 "Your Wedding Day"ψ
 "The Deluge"ψ
 "I'm Martin Guerre"ψ
 "Without You as a Friend"ψ
 "Death Scene"ψ
 "The Conversion"
 "God's Anger"ψ
 "How Many Tears"ψ
 "Dear Louison"
 "Welcome to the Land"ψ
 "The Confession"
 "The Seasons Turn"
 "Don't"ψ
 "All the Years"
 "The Holy Fight"ψ
 "The Dinner"
 "The Revelation"ψ
 "The Day Has Come"ψ
 "If You Still Love Me"
 "The Courtroom"ψ
 "Who?"ψ
 "I'm Martin Guerre"ψ (Reprise)
 "All That I Love"ψ
 "The Imposter is Here"ψ
 "The Final Witness"ψ
 "The Verdict"ψ
 "Justice Will Be Done"ψ
 "Benoit's Lament"
 "Why?"ψ
 "The Burning"ψ
 "The Killing"ψ
 "You Will Be Mine"
 "How Many Tears"
 "Live with Somebody You Love"ψ (Reprise)

ψ - Songs included on the UK Tour Cast Album

For the US tour, the positioning of the songs "Live with Somebody You Love" and "Without You as a Friend" were swapped, and "The Day Has Come" had re-written lyrics and was titled "Alone".

2007 Newbury production

 "Overture"
 "Working On the Land"
 "Where's the Child"
 "Martin Guerre" (new lyrics)
 "Here Comes the Morning"
 "Sleeping On Our Own"
 "Duty"
 "When Will Someone Hear?"
 "Louison - Someone As Beautiful As Her?"
 "Thank God You're Here"¥
 "What Do I Say?"Ŧ
 "The Seasons"
 "Live with Somebody You Love"
 "Bethlehem"
 "The Dinner"
 "One by One"
 "Live with Somebody You Love" (Reprise)
 "The Courtroom"
 "Martin Guerre" (Reprise) (new lyrics)
 "Someone"
 "The Imposters"
 "The Last Witness"
 "Here Comes the Morning" (Reprise)
 "The Sentence"
 "I Will Make You Proud"
 "The Jail"
 "The Reckoning"

Awards and nominations

Original London production

Notes

References
Hey, Mr. Producer! The Musical World of Cameron Mackintosh by Sheridan Morley and Ruth Leon, published in the UK by Weidenfeld & Nicolson and in the US by Back Stage Books, 1998

Musicals by Claude-Michel Schönberg
1996 musicals
West End musicals
Musicals inspired by real-life events
Musicals based on films
Laurence Olivier Award-winning musicals
Sung-through musicals